Mount Auburn may refer to:

In the United States:
Mount Auburn, Illinois

Mount Auburn, Indiana
Mount Auburn, Franklin County, Indiana
Mount Auburn, Iowa
Mount Auburn Cemetery,  Cambridge and Watertown, Massachusetts
Mount Auburn Historic District, Cincinnati, Ohio
Mount Auburn Hospital, Cambridge, Massachusetts

See also
 Mount Auburn Cemetery (disambiguation)